The 2013 Copa Internacional de Tenis Total Digest was a professional tennis tournament played on hard courts. It was the first edition of the tournament which was part of the 2013 ATP Challenger Tour. It took place in Mexico City, Mexico between 15 and 21 April 2013.

Singles main draw entrants

Seeds

 1 Rankings are as of April 8, 2013.

Other entrants
The following players received wildcards into the singles main draw:
  Antoine Benneteau
  Miguel Gallardo-Valles
  Eduardo Peralta-Tello
  Miguel Ángel Reyes-Varela

The following players received entry as an alternate into the singles main draw:
  Norbert Gombos
  Michael Lammer

The following players received entry from the qualifying draw:
  Christopher Díaz Figueroa
  Chris Guccione
  Gianni Mina
  Franko Škugor

Doubles main draw entrants

Seeds

1 Rankings as of April 8, 2013.

Other entrants
The following pairs received wildcards into the doubles main draw:
  Miguel Gallardo Valles /  Miguel Ángel Reyes-Varela
  Gianni Mina /  Santiago Sierra
  Alejandro Moreno Figueroa /  Manuel Sánchez

Champions

Singles

 Andrej Martin def.  Adrian Mannarino, 4–6, 6–4, 6–1

Doubles

 Carsten Ball /  Chris Guccione def.  Jordan Kerr /  John-Patrick Smith, 6–3, 3–6, [11–9]

External links
Official Website

Copa Internacional de Tenis Total Digest
Copa Internacional de Tenis Total Digest
2013 in Mexican tennis